Pummel may refer to:

 Strike (attack) someone in sports, combat, and some martial arts
 Pummel (album), of 1995 by punk rock band All

See also
 Pommel (disambiguation)